David Knopfler (born 27 December 1952) is a British singer-songwriter. He was born in Scotland and raised in Newcastle upon Tyne, England, from the age of two. Together with his older brother Mark Knopfler, John Illsley, and Pick Withers, he founded the rock band Dire Straits in 1977, serving as rhythm guitarist on their first two albums. After quitting the band, Knopfler embarked upon a solo career as a recording artist. Knopfler initially created smaller record labels, publishing companies, and indie labels.

Early life
Knopfler was born in Glasgow, Scotland, to an English mother, Louisa Mary (née Laidler), a teacher, and a Hungarian Jewish father, Erwin Knopfler, an architect. When Knopfler was four, his family moved to Newcastle upon Tyne, England, where he grew up and later attended Gosforth Grammar School. By the age of 11, Knopfler owned a guitar, a piano and a drum kit, and by 14 he was playing and singing his own compositions in folk clubs. After attending Bristol Polytechnic, Knopfler became a social worker in London.

Career

Dire Straits 
Knopfler introduced his older brother, guitarist Mark Knopfler, to his bassist flatmate John Illsley. After gaining the interest of drummer Pick Withers, the four founded the rock band Dire Straits. One of Mark's friends came up with the band's name, which was supposedly a reference to their financial situation at the time the band was beginning to gain notice in the music industry. David however, asserts on his website that "[the] notion that the band were literally in dire straits is largely retrospective myth making and not really factually supportable. We all had day jobs until we got a whacking big advance from Polygram."

Knopfler played rhythm guitar beside his brother, who was lead guitarist in the band. He appeared on Dire Straits' first two albums: Dire Straits (1978) and Communiqué (1979). The stress of composing, arranging songs, recording the then-requisite two albums and tours to support them took its toll on the brothers, and David left the band during the recording of their third album, Making Movies (1980), leaving him uncredited on the album.

Solo
After leaving Dire Straits, Knopfler released his first solo album in 1983, Release. Mark Knopfler and John Illsley both played on the album. Harry Bogdanovs, a lifelong friend of Knopfler, is credited with having co-written three of the tracks and playing synthesiser. The album was supported by the single "Soul Kissing" on the label of Peach River Records. The single peaked at No. 82 in the UK Albums Chart, after Knopfler retrieved the rights from the bankrupt record label.

Behind the Lines, his second album, was released in 1985 and his third solo album, Cut the Wire, followed in 1986. In 1988, the U.S. label Cypress Records released his fourth album, Lips Against the Steel.

Knopfler scored the soundtracks for the films Shergar (1984) and Laser Mission (1989), and the German productions Treffer (1984), Jakob hinter der blauen Tür (1989) and The Great Bellheim.

Lifelines in 1991 released by Phonogram, was recorded in Peter Gabriel's Real World Studios. That album was followed in 1993 by The Giver, released by MESA/Bluemoon in the U.S., and Ariola in Europe. Its sparse, acoustic arrangements received positive reviews, as did 1995's Small Mercies, which Knopfler co-produced with Harry Bogdanovs, featuring Chris White on saxophone. In 2001, Knopfler worked with Bogdanovs again to co-produce the album Wishbones, which has guest appearances by Chris Rea and Eddi Reader. His ninth solo album, Ship of Dreams, which featured Chris Rea as guest guitarist, was released in 2004.

In May 2005, Knopfler published a book of poetry, Blood Stones and Rhythmic Beasts, which was released by the UK's BlackWing books.

The Canadian jazz label Justin Time Records released Ship of Dreams in October 2005 with an alternate rendition of "Tears Fall" featuring Megan Slankard (replacing Julia Neigel on the original European release). Knopfler's tenth solo album Songs for the Siren was released in 2006. Recent songwriting projects with other artists have included sessions with Amilia Spicer, Mack Starks, Megan Slankard and Wendy Lands.

He played various acoustic and electric gigs in Germany, Switzerland, Austria, Canada, Turkey and Australia from 2007 to 2009 with Harry Bogdanovs and his band. A new double CD Acoustic, which contains unplugged renditions of new and old songs was released in 2011.

Knopfler continued to tour in Spain, Germany, the UK, the United States and Canada in 2012 to 2015. The first-ever limited edition live album, Made in Germany (recorded in Erfurt, Germany during the 2012 tour with Bogdanovs), was released in April 2013 exclusively via CDBaby.com.

The album Last Train Leaving was released in 2020. Another album, Songs of Loss and Love, was released in December 2020.

Discography with Dire Straits

1978 – Dire Straits
1979 – Communiqué
1980 – Making Movies (Knopfler left the band toward the end of recording sessions in August 1980, and does not appear on the final release as his contribution was re-recorded. There are, however, a number of pieces of video showing him playing tracks from the album, among them "Solid Rock" and "Les Boys")
1988 – Money for Nothing (compilation)
1995 – Live at the BBC
1998 – Sultans of Swing: The Very Best of Dire Straits (compilation)
2005 – The Best of Dire Straits & Mark Knopfler: Private Investigations (compilation)

Solo discography

1983 – Release
1985 – Behind the Lines
1986 – Cut the Wire
1988 – Lips Against the Steel
1991 – Lifelines
1993 – The Giver
1995 – Small Mercies
2001 – Wishbones
2004 – Ship of Dreams
2006 – Songs for the Siren
2009 – Anthology: 1983–2008
2011 – Acoustic (with Harry Bogdanovs)
2013 – Made in Germany (Live in Erfurt) (with Harry Bogdanovs)
2015 – Grace
2016 – Anthology Vol. 2 & 3
2019 – Heartlands
2020 – Last Train Leaving
2020 – Songs of Loss and Love
2021 – Anthology Volume Four
2021 – Shooting For The Moon
2022 – Skating On The Lake

See also

 List of film score composers
 List of people from Newcastle upon Tyne
 List of poets
 List of rhythm guitarists

References

External links

 
 
 Crowdfunding for Grace

1952 births
Living people
20th-century British composers
20th-century British male singers
20th-century British writers
21st-century composers
21st-century British singers
21st-century British writers
Alumni of the University of the West of England, Bristol
Dire Straits members
British jazz guitarists
British jazz pianists
British jazz singers
British male film score composers
British male guitarists
British male jazz musicians
British male pianists
British male poets
British multi-instrumentalists
British people of Hungarian-Jewish descent
British record producers
British rock guitarists
British rock keyboardists
British rock singers
British male singer-songwriters
Founders
Musicians from Newcastle upon Tyne
People educated at Gosforth Academy
Rhythm guitarists